Robert Ellis Scott (June 9, 1921 – January 5, 2006) was an American stage, film and television actor who appeared in over 100 films between 1938 and 1994, according to the Internet Movie Database. Sometimes he was credited as Mark Roberts, Bob Scott, Robert E. Scott, or Robert Scott.

Early years
A native of Denver, Colorado, Roberts began acting when he was 4, appearing in a play in kindergarten. "The smell of greasepaint got me," he said years later. During his childhood, the family moved to Lakewood, Ohio, and later to Kansas City, Missouri. Roberts attended Southwest High School in Kansas City and the University of Arizona at Tucson, where he majored in English.

Film
Soon after Roberts graduated from college, a screen test at Columbia Pictures led to a long-term contract for him.

He made his film debut in Brother Rat, a 1938 film directed by William Keighley and starring Ronald Reagan.  Roberts played an uncredited bit role as Tripod Andrews. After that, he was billed as Robert Scott in three films before obtaining his first and only leading role in the 1944 Columbia serial Black Arrow. He also served in the United States Army Air Forces during World War II. Following discharge, he acted under the name of Mark Roberts.

Roberts appeared (uncredited) in It’s a Wonderful Life, the 1946 classic Frank Capra film. He and Carl (Alfalfa) Switzer played Mickey and Freddie Othello, respectively, the two guys who unlock the gym floor at the high school dance, exposing the pool below, into which George Bailey (James Stewart) and Mary Hatch (Donna Reed) tumble.

Stage
Roberts played the role of Dunbar in the Broadway production of Stalag 17 (1951). Concurrently, he was a member of the cast of Miss Susan, a television serial. The dual responsibilities meant that Roberts usually left New York City via train at 8 a.m., going to Philadelphia for rehearsals and the program's live broadcast, then he would catch a 6:06 p.m. train back to New York to perform in the play.

Television
Roberts later became a familiar face in selected drama and action television series. He starred as reporter Hildy Johnson in the 1949-1950 syndicated television series The Front Page. In the 1960–1961 season, he joined Stephen Dunne (1918–1977) playing brothers who were private detectives in the syndicated television series, The Brothers Brannagan, which aired 39 episodes. Roberts played Bob Brannagan; Dunne, Mike Brannagan. He made seven guest appearances on Perry Mason, including two 1962 roles as the murder victim: title character Otto Gervaert/Gabe Phillips in "The Case of the Absent Artist," and Tod Richards in "The Case of the Playboy Pugilist." He portrayed murderer Wayne Jameson in "The Case of the Nebulous Nephew". Mark Roberts appeared in Barnaby Jones portraying a character named Tony Bloom; episode titled, "Perchance to Kill"(03/11/1973).

Roberts made his last screen appearance in the short-lived 1994 sitcom Monty.

Personal life
Roberts married Audrey Von Clemm in Philadelphia, Pennsylvania, in 1953. The couple had three children—Col. Ward E. Scott II, Margot Silverman, and Jeffrey F. Scott—before divorcing in 1967. 

Roberts married I Dream of Jeannie actress Emmaline Henry on November 1, 1969. Scott and Henry divorced in 1974.

Death
Roberts died at the age of 84 in Los Angeles, California. He is survived by his three children and his partner, Jane Cole Scott (1981-death).

Selected filmography

Films

Brother Rat (1938) - Tripod Andrews (uncredited)
The Escape (1939) - Mickey (uncredited)
Those Were the Days! (1940) - Allison
Remember Pearl Harbor (1942) - Marine (uncredited)
The Girl in the Case (1944) - Tommy Rockwood (uncredited)
Black Arrow (1944, Serial) - Black Arrow
One Mysterious Night (1944) - George Daley
The Crime Doctor's Courage (1945) - Bob Rencoret
Ten Cents a Dance (1945) - Ted Kimball, III
Prison Ship (1945) - Maj. Trevor
Life with Blondie (1945) - Montana (uncredited)
Out of the Depths (1945) - 'Pills' Wilkins
A Close Call for Boston Blackie (1946) - John Peyton (uncredited)
The Notorious Lone Wolf (1946) - Dick Hale
The Bandit of Sherwood Forest (1946) - Robin Hood's Man
Gilda (1946) - Gabe Evans
Talk About a Lady (1946) - Reporter (uncredited)
The Unknown (1946) - Reed Cawthorne
Cowboy Blues (1946) - Jerry Winston
Shadowed (1946) - Mark Bellaman
It's a Wonderful Life (1946) - Mickey (uncredited)
Dead Reckoning (1947) - Bandleader (uncredited)
Prairie Raiders (1947) - Bronc Masters
Exposed (1947) - William Foresman III
The Invisible Wall (1947) - Bellhop (uncredited)
The Bride Goes Wild (1948) - Piute (uncredited)
Shed No Tears (1948) - Ray Belden
Michael O'Halloran (1948) - Pete
The Blonde Bandit (1950) - Airport Mechanic
Call Me Mister (1951) - Sergeant to Chief of Staff (uncredited)
The Unknown Man (1951) - Reporter (uncredited)
The Pride of St. Louis (1952)
Just for You (1952) - Reporter (uncredited)
Off Limits (1952) - Non-Com (uncredited)
Taxi (1953) - Jim Turner
Ma and Pa Kettle on Vacation (1953) - Teddy Kettle (uncredited)
Pony Express (1953) - Pony Express Rider (uncredited)
The Buster Keaton Story (1957)
The Sad Sack (1957) - Sergeant (uncredited)
Onionhead (1958) - Lt. J.G. Bennett
Last Train from Gun Hill (1959) - Train Conductor (uncredited)
The Money Jungle (1967) - Joe Diguseppe
The Girl Who Knew Too Much (1969) - Stephen Kasai
Posse (1975) - Mr. Cooper
Jacqueline Susann's Once Is Not Enough (1999) - Rheingold
Spontaneous Combustion (1990) - Dr. Simpson

Television

Kraft Television Theatre (1949–1958) - Kelly / Pete Redfield / Adam Smith
Miss Susan (1951) - Bill Carter (1951)
Three Steps to Heaven (1953) - Bill Morgan #1
The Philco Television Playhouse (1954)
Studio One (1954) - David Thorpe
Robert Montgomery Presents (1955)
The Alcoa Hour (1955) - Dr. Emmett
Letter to Loretta (1956–1960)
Cheyenne (1957) - Boyd Copeland
Gunsmoke (1957) - Adams
Perry Mason (1957–1965) - Customer in restaurant / Irving Florian / Ben Scott / Wayne Jameson / Tod Richards / Otto Gervaert / Gabe Phillips / James Castleton / Bob Kimber
The Millionaire (1958) - Bob Harris
Richard Diamond, Private Detective (1958, Episode: "Bungalow Murder" ) - Rod Leighton
M Squad (1959) - Joey Devon
77 Sunset Strip (1959) - Johnny Liston / Harry Orrwitt
Alcoa Presents: One Step Beyond (1960) - Pete Rankin
Surfside 6 (1961) - Ted Walters
The Brothers Brannagan (1960–1961) - Bob Brannagan / Bill Brannagan
Adventures in Paradise (1961) - Ralph Harris
Follow the Sun (1962) - Howard Ramsey
General Hospital (1963) - Charles Sutton (1982)
The Outer Limits (1963, Episode: "The Hundred Days of the Dragon") - Bob Conner
12 O'Clock High (1966) - Maj. John Davidson
The F.B.I. (1966–1972) - Ernest Malloy / SAC Murray Davis / SAC Owen Clark / SRA Will Channahon / SAC Johnson / SAC Warren Berwick / Howard Schaal
The Invaders (1967) - Dr. Sam Larousse
Ironside (1968) - Jim Hennessy
Dan August (1970–1971) - Spence
Barnaby Jones (1973–1975) - Donald Harrelson / Ted Mason / Curt Fowler / Tony Bloom
Doctors' Hospital (1976) - Dr. Malone
The Rockford Files (1978) - Hillman Stewart / Agent Kleinhoff
Dynasty (1987) - Harry Donalds
Dark Justice (1993) - Mr. Collins

References

Demetria Fulton previewed Mark Roberts' appearance in Barnaby Jones portraying a character named Tony Bloom; episode titled, "Perchance to Kill"(03/11/1973).

External links

1921 births
2006 deaths
American male film actors
American male stage actors
American male television actors
United States Army personnel of World War II
United States Army soldiers
Male actors from Denver
20th-century American male actors